Erbito Salavarria (born January 20, 1946) is a retired professional boxer from the Philippines and a former WBC, WBA and Lineal Flyweight Champion.

Biography 

Salavarria made his professional debut in 1963. He captured the WBC and lineal flyweight title with a TKO win over Chartchai Chionoi in 1970. He lost the WBC title after being stripped following a draw against Betulio González in 1971.

In 1975, Salavarria captured the WBA flyweight title with a split decision win over Susumu Hanagata.  He lost the belt in his first defense to Alfonso Lopez in 1976.  He retired in 1978 after a comeback loss.

Professional boxing record

See also 
 List of flyweight boxing champions
 List of WBC world champions
 List of WBA world champions

References

External links 
 
 Erbito Salavarria - CBZ Profile

1946 births
Flyweight boxers
Living people
People from Santa Cruz, Manila
Sportspeople from Manila
Boxers from Metro Manila
World Boxing Association champions
World Boxing Council champions
World flyweight boxing champions
World boxing champions
Filipino male boxers
Philippine Sports Hall of Fame inductees